The fourth season of the NBC comedy-drama series Parenthood premiered on September 11, 2012 and ended on January 22, 2013. This season consisted of 15 episodes.

Cast

Main cast 
 Peter Krause as Adam Braverman
 Lauren Graham as Sarah Braverman
 Dax Shepard as Crosby Braverman
 Monica Potter as Kristina Braverman
 Erika Christensen as Julia Braverman-Graham
 Sam Jaeger as Joel Graham (14 episodes)
 Savannah Paige Rae as Sydney Graham (12 episodes)
 Xolo Maridueña as Victor Graham (14 episodes)
 Max Burkholder as Max Braverman (13 episodes)
 Joy Bryant as Jasmine Trussell (11 episodes)
 Tyree Brown as Jabbar Trussell  (11 episodes)
 Miles Heizer as Drew Holt (11 episodes)
 Mae Whitman as Amber Holt
 Bonnie Bedelia as Camille Braverman (10 episodes+ 1 episode voice only)
 Craig T. Nelson as Zeek Braverman (12 episodes)

Recurring cast 
 Sarah Ramos as Haddie Braverman
 Mia Allan and Ella Allan as Nora Braverman
 Jason Ritter as Mark Cyr
 Ray Romano as Hank Rizzoli
 Skyler Day as Amy Ellis
 Matt Lauria as Ryan York
 Tina Lifford as Renee Trussell
 Courtney Grosbeck as Ruby Rizzoli
 Kurt Fuller as Dr. Bedsloe
 Hayden Byerly as Micah Watson

Episodes

Ratings

U.S. Live Ratings

References 

2012 American television seasons
2013 American television seasons
Season 4